Colm Gilcreest is an Irish former professional snooker player from Kilmainhamwood.

Career history
He is a former Irish champion. In the 2000 World Snooker Championship Gilcreest won six games against Philip Seaton, Simon Bedford, Robin Hull, Karl Burrows, Jimmy Michie and Stefan Mazrocis to reach the final qualifying round, losing 10–6 to Billy Snaddon.

He reached the final of the 2008 World Amateur Snooker Championship in Wels, Austria where he lost to Thepchaiya Un-Nooh.

Other Sport
Colm Gilcreest also plays gaelic football with Kilmainhamwood GFC. He plays in the right corner forward position and is number 13.

References

Living people
Irish snooker players
People from Navan
1974 births